Bulletin of the Lebedev Physics Institute (Russian: Краткие сообщения по физике, Kratkue Soobsheniya po fisike) is a peer-reviewed scientific journal of physics. The journal was established in 1970, and is published by the Lebedev Physical Institute (in Russian) a monthly basis. Springer publishes an English translation of the journal. It is edited by Oleg N. Krokhin. The online version is available since 2007.

Indexing
Bulletin of the Lebedev Physics Institute is abstracted and indexed in the following databases:

External links
 Bulletin of the Lebedev Physics Institute website 
 Краткие сообщения по физике website 

Physics journals
Science and technology in Russia
Springer Science+Business Media academic journals
Monthly journals